Khanbulanchay reservoir, also known as Khanbulaqchay reservoir, is a lake in Lankaran Rayon of southeastern Azerbaijan. The name means "the spring of the khan" in Azerbaijani language.

Overview
The reservoir was built Bəşəriçay river in 1976. The volume of water in the reservoir is 52 million m³.

See also
 Rivers and lakes in Azerbaijan
 Mingachevir reservoir
 Shamkir reservoir

References

Reservoirs in Azerbaijan
Alborz (mountain range)
Lankaran District
Reservoirs built in the Soviet Union